The Dai Nihonshi (大日本史), literally History of Great Japan, is a book on the history of Japan.  It was begun in the 17th century, during the Edo period, by Tokugawa Mitsukuni, the head of the Mito branch of the Tokugawa family. After his death, work was continued by the Mito branch until its completion in the Meiji era.

Content
The work starts with Emperor Jimmu, the legendary first emperor of Japan, and covers the first hundred emperors, ending with Emperor Go-Komatsu after the merging of the Southern Court and Northern Court in 1392.

The fundamental part, that is, the narration of historical events, occupies the first 73 volumes, the rest constitutes a supplement of which 170 volumes are biographies, 126 descriptions and 28 tables, a total of 397. The whole work comprises 397 volumenes and 5 volumenes of index, total 402 volumes printed.

Context
The book is one of the major scholarly works of the Edo period, and laid the foundation of the Mito school (Mitogaku) and Kokugaku. Aizawa Seishisai a Japanese nationalist thinker from Mito school, also worked on the play. It is heavily influenced by Confucianism, especially the later Neo-Confucianism under Zhu Xi.  However, instead of focusing on the Chinese classics like other Confucian schools, it centered on the Japanese classics and Japan as a land ruled by the tennō (尊王論 sonnōron).

This school of thought led to the Sonnō jōi movement, and eventually the Mito Rebellion against the Tokugawa shogunate during the Bakumatsu period.

Finished the collection
The project took about 250 years to complete, and was officially published in 1906.

Notes

External links
大日本史 - MIKO.ORG
大日本史

Edo-period works

Confucianism in Japan
Mito Domain
Edo-period history books